Janki Bhosale (née Gujar) (1675 - 2 March 1700 CE) was Empress consort of the Maratha Empire as the first wife of Rajaram I.

Jankibai was the daughter of Prataprao Gujar, an aristocratic general, who was the commander-in-chief of the Maratha Empire. Her father died in a battle against the Adil Shahi at Nesari on 24 February 1674. Shivaji Maharaj, the king of the Marathas upon hearing the solemn news, grieved his general's death. As a result, he married his second son, the ten-year-old Rajaram to the five-year-old Jankibai. They were married in a grand ceremony that took place in Raigad Fort on 7 March 1680. Her father-in-law Shivaji died on 3 April 1680, twenty five days after her marriage.

Death
On 2 March 1700, the thirty-year-old Rajaram died following a brief illness. Sources differ on Queen Janakibai's death . Some records say that she committed Sati with her husband at Sinhagad . However Marathi bakhars and letters reveal that Jankibai was one of the captives taken during the Battle of Raigad along with Maharani Yesubai Bhonsale and Shahuji . She was released in 1719 from the Mughal captivity by Peshwa Balaji Vishwanath along with Yesubai and other Maratha women.

References

Women of the Maratha Empire
Indian queen consorts
1675 births
1700 deaths
17th-century Indian women